Davusia glabra commonly called the shiny bait crab., Sowrie crab  or Sourie crab is the sole species of crab in the genus Davusia.  It lives around the low tide area on rocky ocean shores on the eastern coast of Australia (southern Queensland to Victoria), in crevices and rock pools and on rock platforms. The distribution is stated differently in different sources, either from Queensland as far south as the NSW-Victorian border in one source  but including to Wilson’s Promontory (Southern Victoria) in another. The carapace is grey to fawn with very small green spots, resulting in Davusia glabra having a greenish appearance.  The width of the carapace is around 30-40 mm across, and is smooth without hair, slightly wider than long, with 3 distinct spines at each edge 

Plagusia glabra is a synonym of Davusia glabra,. The species was placed in a new genus Davusia in 2007  due to differences in morphology from other species in Plagusia.

References

External links 

Grapsoidea
Animals described in 1852
Fauna of Queensland
Fauna of Victoria (Australia)
Endemic fauna of Australia
Monotypic decapod genera